USS Windhover (ASR-18) was projected as a Chanticleer-class submarine rescue ship and was to be built at Savannah, Georgia, by the Savannah Machine Foundry; however, because of Japan's collapse, the contract for her construction was cancelled on 12 August 1945.

References

 

Chanticleer-class submarine rescue ships
Cancelled ships of the United States Navy